Ise Lodge Ward, formed from the merger of Millbrook ward and the majority of Spinney, was created by boundary changes in 2007 covering roughly the same area covered by Ise Valley Ward prior to 1999.

The ward was last fought at Borough Council level in the 2007 local council elections, in which all three seats were won by the Conservatives.

The current councillors are Cllr. Philip Hollobone, Cllr. Lloyd Bunday and Cllr. Shirley Lynch.

Councillors
Kettering Borough Council Elections 2007
Bob Civil (Conservative)
Matt Lynch (Conservative)
Shirley Lynch (Conservative)

Current Ward Boundaries (2007-)

Kettering Borough Council Elections 2007
Note: due to boundary changes, vote changes listed below are based on notional results.

See also
Kettering
Kettering Borough Council

Electoral wards in Kettering